ASGC may refer to:

 ASGC Construction (Al Shafar General Contracting Construction)
 Association des Scouts et Guides du Congo
 Australasian Society of Genetic Counsellors